Akinsola Ihayere Azeez Akinyemi (born 12 July 1993) is a Norwegian professional footballer who plays for Raufoss IL as a defender.

Career
Starting his career in Holmlia SK, Akinyemi went to Vålerenga as a youth player. He made his Norwegian Premier League debut in August 2012 against Odd, and made a total of three appearances that season.

Akinyemi was released in the summer of 2013. He played for Drøbak-Frogn IL later that season, before joining Grorud IL. Ahead of the 2016 season he stepped up to the second-tier when signing for Fredrikstad FK.

He played abroad in Bulgaria and Israel. On the summer deadline day of 2021 he signed for Raufoss IL.

Akinsola Akinyemi should not be confused with Akinbola Akinyemi, who has also played in the Oslo area, among others for Kjelsås and Follo.

Honours

Club
Lokomotiv Plovdiv
 Bulgarian Cup: 2019–20

References

External links

1993 births
Living people
Norwegian footballers
Holmlia SK players
Vålerenga Fotball players
Eliteserien players
Drøbak-Frogn IL players
Fredrikstad FK players
Sandnes Ulf players
PFC Lokomotiv Plovdiv players
Maccabi Netanya F.C. players
Raufoss IL players
Norwegian First Division players
Norwegian Second Division players
First Professional Football League (Bulgaria) players
Israeli Premier League players
Expatriate footballers in Bulgaria
Expatriate footballers in Israel
Norwegian expatriate sportspeople in Bulgaria
Norwegian expatriate sportspeople in Israel
Association football defenders
Footballers from Oslo
Norwegian people of Nigerian descent